The men's discus throw at the 1971 European Athletics Championships was held in Helsinki, Finland, at Helsinki Olympic Stadium on 14 and 15 August 1971.

Medalists

Results

Final
15 August

Qualification
14 August

Participation
According to an unofficial count, 26 athletes from 16 countries participated in the event.

 (2)
 (1)
 (1)
 (2)
 (3)
 (3)
 (1)
 (2)
 (1)
 (1)
 (1)
 (1)
 (2)
 (1)
 (3)
 (1)

References

Discus throw
Discus throw at the European Athletics Championships